The 2006 Elite League speedway season was the 72nd season of the top division of speedway in the United Kingdom and governed by the Speedway Control Board (SCB), in conjunction with the British Speedway Promoters' Association (BSPA).

Season summary
In 2006, the league consisted of eleven teams, after the newly named Reading Bulldogs, moved up from the Premier League. The Championship was won by the Peterborough Panthers by a single race point in the play-off final.

Peterborough and Reading battled each other throughout the season finishing level on points in the regular season table before Peterborough edged Reading in the Play off final. Peterborough had a strong all round squad and included Danish trio of Hans Andersen, Jesper Jensen and Niels Kristian Iversen, in addition to Australian Ryan Sullivan. Reading who had come up from the division below had recruited Greg Hancock as their main heat leader who finished 7th in the league averages which were headed once again by Australian stars Jason Crump and Leigh Adams.

Final table

Play-offs
Semi-final decided over one leg. Grand Final decided by aggregate scores over two legs.

Semi-finals
Peterborough Panthers 52-40 Coventry Bees
Reading Bulldogs 51-43 Swindon Robins

Final

First leg

Second leg

The Peterborough Panthers were declared League Champions, winning on aggregate 95-94.

Elite League Knockout Cup
The 2006 Elite League Knockout Cup was the 68th edition of the Knockout Cup for tier one teams. Coventry Bees were the winners of the competition.

First round

Quarter-finals

Semi-finals

Final

First leg

Second leg

The Coventry Bees were declared Knockout Cup Champions, winning on aggregate 101-85.

Leading averages

Riders & final averages
Arena Essex

 8.08
 7.78
 6.87
 6.70
 6.53
 6.48
 6.41
 3.77
 3.68
 2.88
 1.40	

Belle Vue

 11.21
 8.08
 7.75
 7.51
	4.89
 4.26
 3.61
 1.90

Coventry

 9.05
 7.93
 7.84
 7.13
 6.59
 6.16
 5.83
 5.54
 4.54

Eastbourne

 9.92
 7.79 
 7.66
 7.14
 5.29
 5.04
 4.88
 4.06
 4.00
 3.42

Ipswich

 8.92
 8.10 
 8.02
 6.50
 6.47
 5.58
 4.09
 3.62
 2.99

Oxford

 9.76 (7 matches only)
 7.98
 6.97
 6.61
 6.27
 5.10
 4.15
 4.12
 3.84
 2.29

Peterborough

 10.40
 8.76 
 8.23
 7.82
 5.55
 5.28
 4.72
 4.67

Poole

 9.39
 8.38
 7.65
 7.22 
 6.09
 5.47
 4.09
 3.63
 2.77

Reading

 9.28
 8.13
 7.60
 7.52
 7.01
 6.39
 5.52
 5.43

Swindon

 10.47
 7.72
 7.65
 7.16
 5.98
 5.48
 4.91
 4.47
 3.40

Wolverhampton

 9.94 
 8.37
 8.12
 5.56
 5.19
 4.71
 4.37
 1.76

See also
 Speedway in the United Kingdom
 List of United Kingdom Speedway League Champions
 Knockout Cup (speedway)

References

SGB Premiership
2006 in British motorsport